Patronage Sainte-Anne is a Congolese football club based in Brazzaville, Republic of the Congo. They play in the Congo Premier League.

Honours
Congo Premier League: 2
 1969, 1986.

Coupe du Congo: 1
 1988.

Super Coupe du Congo: 0

Football clubs in the Republic of the Congo
Sports clubs in Brazzaville